South is a Portuguese police noir, in nine episodes, created by Edgar Medina and Guilherme Mendonça, directed by Ivo M. Ferreira and produced by Arquipélago Filmes. Soundtrack by Dead Combo. The series premiered on the 28 September 2019, on RTP1, and broadcast ended on the 23 November 2019.

Synopsis 
A nihilistic and socially awkward police inspector of the Criminal Investigation Unit probes a string of suspicious deaths by drowning in the Tagus River. As the investigation becomes murkier, help comes from an unexpected source. Meanwhile, the country reels from an intense economic and social crisis.

Reception 
South series was recognized as "a milestone for Portuguese audiovisual landscape", being the first national television series to be selected for presentation in the CoPro Series in 2018, a section of Berlinale's Co-Production Market, integrating the list of 8 international drama series to be presented in the festival's co-production market. In 2019, the series returned to the Berlin International Film Festival to show the first episode, in the Drama Series Days (EFM / Berlinale) section.

The nine episodes of the series were shown between 28 September and 23 November 2019, on RTP1. The series was recognized by national and international critics, having been praised for its technical and narrative quality, considered the best Portuguese series of the year and equated with the best series produced in the world.

"That the series was screened in Berlin is proof South stands alongside the top-quality TV dramas now being produced around the world. All eyes will now be on Portugal to see whether the country can follow Spain's footsteps in establishing itself as a storytelling force on the international stage." Michael Pickard, Drama Quarterly, October 2019

"The biggest surprise comes unexpectedly from Portugal with a very well structured thriller and, above all, very illustrative of the serious Portuguese economic situation five years ago, without hesitating to criticize all levels thanks to the great character of Humberto, a loser who has nothing more to lose and will go deep to discover the network behind that first crime." Lorenzo Mejino, El Diario Vasco, December 2019

"And, what matters most: people, people from Lisbon, that we see so little of in our novels, movies or newspapers. A series called South, as if an appeal to depart, when its story, sound and forms, and people above all, grab us to stay. (...) I suspect another game will be coming to our homes in the upcoming weeks: Will the screenwriters have the nerve, during the next season to be filmed in 2020, to remove from our 2021 Saturdays' company, those who we came to love in 2019? The viewers anguish for fear of the disappearance of any of those artists, in which we will find good characters, is an extra bonus from South." Ferreira Fernandes, Diário de Notícias, October 2019

"It was also in the middle of Lisbon's transition that Edgar Medina started to write South, the best Portuguese series of 2019 and one of the best of the year (RTP1). Lisbon is a noir detective story in the troika's ballad that is South, and we can feel the urgency that Guilherme Mendonça, Rui Cardoso Martins e Ivo M. Ferreira felt to tell the history of a town that has already started to fade from memory - the same one that lived in this decade, before tourists, Airbnb and cruises, a ghost in the pre-Web Summit machine of Sócrates and Ricardo Salgado, populated by entrepreneurs, policemen, bankers and politicians." Joana Amaral Cardoso, Público, December 2019

On 24 August 2020, the series became available in the catalog of the streaming service HBO Portugal.

In 2020, the series was distinguished with the Sophia Award from the Portuguese Academy of Cinema for Best Series / Television and the Authors Award from the Portuguese Society of Authors for Best Fiction Program. Sul also reached the shortlist of nominees for the Ibero-American Cinema awards, Premios Platino Xcaret, in the category of Best TV Series (among other categories).

Cast 
 Adriano Luz as Humberto
 Jani Zhao as Alice
 Afonso Pimentel as Matilha
 Margarida Vila-Nova as Mafalda
 Ivo Canelas as Pastor Santoro
 Beatriz Batarda as Journalist
 Nuno Lopes as inspector Rebelo
 Margarida Marinho as Rosário
 José Raposo as Veríssimo
 Adriano Carvalho as Inspector-Chief
 Miguel Guilherme as Dário Monteiro
 Miguel Seabra as Xavier
 Américo Silva as Pedro Chambell

Additional cast 
 Francisco Tavares as Real Estate Agent
 António Fonseca as Coroner
 Maria João Abreu as Alexandra Chambel
 Duarte Grilo as Valério
 Rita Cabaço as Guida
 Andreia Bento as Berta
 Eric Santos as Pastor Santoro Henchmen
 Paula Só as D. Helena
 Estevâo Antunes as Pastor Santoro Henchmen 2
 Paulo Calatré as Inspector Júdice
 Jaime Freitas as Inspetor Dâmaso
 Leonor Silveira as employment center employee
 Pedro Inês as Chico
 Isabél Zuaa as Young Smith
 Manuel Moreira as Director Plantae\
 Beatriz Menino as Ana
 Custódia Gallego as Makeup Artist
 João Pedro Mamede as Kiko
 Isac Graça as Joka
 Filipa Cardoso as Celestina Verónica
 Paula Guedes as Mimi
 Sara Belo as Ex-wife
 Paulo Nery as Mayor
 Maria João Pinho as Mayor’s Wife
 Guilherme Filipe as Fortunato Santos
 Cândido Ferreira as Henrique Maia
 Isaac Carvalho as Babysitting Kid
 Matita Ferreira as Babysitting Kid 2
 Miguel Nunes as Nuno
 Ivo Alexandre as police officer
 Lydie Barbara as nurse
 Pedro Barbeitos as port security
 Raimundo Cosme as churchgoer
 Miguel Monteiro as guard
 Emanuele Simontacchi
 Nicolas Brites

Episodes

References 

Crime television series
2019 Portuguese television series debuts
Portuguese-language television shows
Portuguese drama television series